As-Salih Ismaʿil al-Malik (1163–1181) was an emir of Damascus and emir of Aleppo in 1174, the son of Nur ad-Din.

Biography
He was only eleven years old when his father died in 1174. As-Salih came under the protection of the eunuch Gümüshtekin and was taken to Aleppo, while Nur ad-Din's officers competed for supremacy. In Egypt, Saladin recognized as-Salih as his lord, although he in fact was eager to unite Egypt and Syria under his own personal rule. In 1174, Saladin took Baalbek after a four-month siege and then entered Damascus, proclaiming himself to be Ismail's true regent. In 1176, Saladin defeated the Zengids outside the city, married Ismat ad-Din Khatun, and was recognized as ruler of Syria. As-Salih died in 1181 of illness. According to crusader legend, his mother was the sister of Bertrand of Toulouse, Razi Khatun, who had been captured by Nur ad-Din in the aftermath of the Second Crusade; a similar legend existed concerning the mother of Zengi, as-Salih's grandfather.

References

Bibliography
 .

1163 births
1181 deaths
Atabegs
Zengid rulers
People from Damascus